George Clavell (1725–1774), of Smedmore, in Kimmeridge, Dorset, was an English politician.

He was a Member (MP) of the Parliament of England for Dorchester 1752 to 1754.

References

1725 births
1774 deaths
Politicians from Dorset
English politicians